"This Love" is the fourth single by Japanese singer Angela Aki, and was the third ending theme song of Blood+. The single was released on May 31, 2006, and made its debut on the Oricon Weekly Charts at number six.

Track listing

Live performances
 Music Station Super Live

Charts

External links
Official Discography 

Angela Aki songs
2006 singles
Japanese-language songs
Songs written by Angela Aki
2006 songs
Sony Music Entertainment Japan singles